The 1972 PGA Championship was the 54th PGA Championship, played August 3–6 at Oakland Hills Country Club in Bloomfield Hills, Michigan, a suburb northwest of Detroit. Gary Player won his second PGA Championship with a total of 281 (+1), two strokes ahead of runners-up Tommy Aaron and Jim Jamieson. It was the sixth of Player's nine major titles, but his first in over four years.

The PGA Championship returned to the month of August in 1972 after being played in late February in 1971 in Florida.

Defending champion Jack Nicklaus, winner of the year's Masters and U.S. Open and runner-up in the British Open, finished six strokes back in a tie for thirteenth place. He regained the title the following year.

It was the fifth major championship held on the South Course, which previously hosted the U.S. Open in 1924, 1937, 1951, and 1961. It later hosted the PGA Championship in 1979 and 2008, the U.S. Open in 1985 and 1996, and the Ryder Cup in 2004.

Course layout

Past champions in the field

Made the cut

Missed the cut 

Source:

Round summaries

First round
Thursday, August 3, 1972

Source:

Second round
Friday, August 4, 1972

Source:

Third round
Saturday, August 5, 1972

Source:

Final round
Sunday, August 6, 1972

Source:

References

External links
PGA Media Guide 2012
PGA.com – 1972 PGA Championship

PGA Championship
Golf in Michigan
Bloomfield Hills, Michigan
PGA Championship
PGA Championship
PGA Championship
PGA Championship